The 2009 Chrono des Nations was the 28th edition of the Chrono des Nations cycle race and was held on 18 October 2009. The race started and finished in Les Herbiers. The race was won by Alexander Vinokourov.

General classification

References

2009
2009 in road cycling
2009 in French sport
October 2009 sports events in France